Chery Jaguar Land Rover (officially Chery Jaguar Land Rover Automotive Company Ltd.) is an automotive manufacturing company headquartered in Changshu, China.

A 50:50 joint venture between UK-headquartered Jaguar Land Rover, itself a subsidiary of Tata Motors of India; and Chinese state owned automaker Chery, it was formed to allow production of Jaguar Cars and Land Rover vehicles in mainland China. Chery Jaguar Land Rover's first assembly plant is in Changshu, with production having commenced in October 2014.

History
Chery and Jaguar Land Rover were first reported to be in discussions about the possible creation of a Chinese joint venture manufacturing company in August 2010.

In March 2012, Chery and Jaguar Land Rover announced plans to invest an initial US$2.78 billion in a new Mainland China-based joint venture to manufacture Jaguar and Land Rover vehicles and engines, as well as the establishment of a research and development centre and the creation of a new automobile marque.

The establishment of the joint venture received the formal approval of the National Development and Reform Commission in November 2012. Construction of Chery Jaguar Land Rover's first assembly plant began in Changshu in the same month, with a planned completion date of July 2014.

Products
 Range Rover Evoque
 Land Rover Discovery Sport
 Jaguar XFL
 Jaguar XEL
 Jaguar E-Pace

Gallery

References

Car manufacturers of China
Chery
Jaguar Land Rover